is a railway station  located in the city of Noshiro, Akita Prefecture, Japan, operated by East Japan Railway Company (JR East).

Lines

Station layout
The station has one side platform, serving a single bidirectional track. The unattended station is managed from Noshiro Station.

History
It was renamed to its present name on June 15, 1943. The JGR became the JNR (Japan National Railways) after World War II. With the privatization of the JNR on April 1, 1987, the station has been managed by JR East. A new station building was completed in 2009, replacing the modified boxcar which had previously been in use.

Surrounding area
 
 Nishiro Beach
Sugisawadai ruins

References

External links

JR East station information page 

Railway stations in Japan opened in 1926
Railway stations in Akita Prefecture
Gonō Line
Noshiro, Akita